Queen Anne style may refer to:

 Queen Anne style architecture, the 18th century Queen Anne style architecture in Britain
 British Queen Anne Revival architecture of the late 19th century in Britain
 New World Queen Anne Revival architecture, the late 19th and early 20th centuries revival of Queen Anne style architecture, which encompasses 
 Queen Anne style architecture in the United States, the Queen Anne revival style architecture in the United States
 Australian Queen Anne style, a component of Australian Federation architecture
 Queen Anne style furniture, the Queen Anne style of furniture design